Maupin may refer to:

Maupin (surname)
Maupin, Missouri, an unincorporated community
Maupin, Oregon, a city in United States
La Maupin or Julie d'Aubigny (1670–1707), French swordswoman and opera singer